The 1907–08 Rugby Union County Championship was the 20th edition of England's premier rugby union club competition at the time.  

Cornwall won the competition for the first time in front of 17,000 spectators defeating Durham in the final at Redruth 17-3 scoring 5 tries through Solomon (2) Tregurtha, Bennetts and Davey. It was Durham's ninth consecutive final appearance.

Final

See also
 English rugby union system
 Rugby union in England

References

Rugby Union County Championship
County Championship (rugby union) seasons